Uplands is name of an electoral ward coterminous with the community of Uplands, in the City and County of Swansea, Wales, UK.

Description
The electoral ward consists of some or all of the following areas: Uplands, Brynmill, St. Helen's, Cwmgwyn, Ffynone, and The Lons. It is in the parliamentary constituency of Swansea West. The ward is bounded by the Sketty ward to the west, Townhill to the north, Castle and Waterfront to the east and the sea (Swansea Bay) to the south.

For electoral purposes Uplands is divided into the polling districts of: WU Uplands North, WV Glanmor,  WW Ffynone, WX St. Helens, WY Brynmill and WZ Uplands South.

Uplands returns four councillors to the local City and County of Swansea Council.

Uplands Party
The Uplands Party was formed in 2016 to contest local elections in the Uplands ward. It was founded by Peter May, who had previously stood as an Independent candidate and as a Liberal Democrat. The Uplands Party campaigns on issues local to the ward, such as street cleaning and houses of multiple occupation, and avoids national politics. It won two of the four Uplands seats in May 2017 and all four seats at the May 2022 elections.

Local election results

2022 Swansea council elections
The Uplands Party won all four seats at the 2022 election, taking an additional two seats from Labour. This was despite one of the Uplands Party candidates, Allan Jeffery, suffering a heart attack whilst out campaigning and being hospitalised for the election result.

2017 Swansea council elections
Uplands was identified as one  of the key battlegrounds in the May 2017 council elections. Previously held by the Labour Party, it was predicted to become a multi-party ward, with challengers from the Uplands Party, including sitting councillor Peter May.

2014 by-election
Following the resignation of Pearleen Sangha in late September 2014, a by-election was called for the fourth seat in the ward. The Independent politician Peter May was elected with 32.8% of the vote.

2012 Swansea council elections
The councillors elected in May 2012 were:  Nick Davies, John Charles Bayliss, Neil Ronconi-Woollard and Pearleen Sangha, all of whom represent the Wales Labour Party.
The results were:

2008 Swansea council elections
In the 2008 local elections for Uplands, there were 20 candidates, each contesting for one of 4 seats in the Uplands.  Candidates were fielded by the Conservatives, Labour and Plaid Cymru.  All four current Liberal Democrat councillors sought re-election.  Four of the candidates sought votes for just one issue - the Slip Bridge.  The "Slip Bridge four" who are not party affiliated were campaigning for the reinstatement of a bridge crossing at the Slip and wider issues of preserving Swansea's green spaces and heritage.

The turnout for the 2008 elections for Uplands was 29.83%.  The results were:

References

External links
Details about the ward of Uplands

Swansea electoral wards